Patrice A. McCarthy (born 1952 or 1953) is an American politician serving as the 11th Washington State Auditor since 2017. She is a member of the Democratic Party.

Career
McCarthy earned her bachelor of Arts in liberal studies from the University of Washington Tacoma in 1992. She served as the school board director for the Tacoma School District from 1987 to 1999 and as the county executive of Pierce County, Washington.

In 2016, McCarthy was elected Washington State Auditor, defeating Republican Mark Miloscia. She won reelection in 2020, receiving 60 percent of the vote against Chris Leyba.

Personal life 
Her husband, John, has served on the Port of Tacoma commission and as a judge of the Pierce County Superior Court. Their son, Conor, served on the Tacoma City Council, before resigning to become a lobbyist for Comcast.

References

External links

Government website

21st-century American politicians
Living people
Place of birth missing (living people)
Politicians from Tacoma, Washington
State auditors of Washington
Washington (state) Democrats
Year of birth missing (living people)